is a single by Mayu Watanabe. It reached number one in the Oricon Weekly Chart. Watanabe is the fourth AKB48 member with a number-one solo single after Atsuko Maeda, Tomomi Itano, and Rino Sashihara.

Background 
The single was released in five versions: Limited Edition A, Limited Edition B, Limited Edition C, Regular Edition, and Complete Production Edition. This single's theme was a Vocaloid/Anime theme, which reflects Watanabe's personality and hobbies.

Charts

References

External links
 Mayu Watanabe's discography
 
 

2012 singles
Oricon Weekly number-one singles
Japanese-language songs
Mayu Watanabe songs
Sony Music Entertainment Japan singles
Songs with lyrics by Yasushi Akimoto
2012 songs